Allium platycaule is a species of wild onion known as broadstemmed onion or flat-stem onion. It is native to northeastern California, south-central Oregon (Lake County) and northwestern Nevada (Washoe and Humboldt Counties). It is found on slopes of elevations of 1500–2500 m.

It may be thicker along the midrib and much narrower along the sides. The long, flat leaves are sickle-shaped. Atop the stem is an umbel which may have as many as 90 flowers in it. Each flower may be up to a centimeter and a half wide but the tepals are quite narrow so as to be almost threadlike. The inflorescence therefore may appear be a dense ball of filaments. The flowers are generally bright pink to magenta with yellow anthers.

Uses
The leaves, bulbs, and seeds were utilized as food by the Northern Paiute people.

References

External links
 

platycaule
Onions
Flora of California
Flora of Oregon
Flora of Nevada
Flora of the Great Basin
~
Plants described in 1879
Taxa named by Sereno Watson
Flora without expected TNC conservation status